The Catholic Church in Germany comprises 7 ecclesiastical provinces each headed by an archbishop. The provinces are in turn subdivided into 20 dioceses and 7 archdioceses each headed by a bishop or an archbishop.

List of Dioceses

Episcopal Conference of Germany

Ecclesiastical province of Bamberg 
 Archdiocese of Bamberg
 Diocese of Eichstätt
 Diocese of Speyer
 Diocese of Würzburg

Ecclesiastical province of Berlin 
 Archdiocese of Berlin
 Diocese of Dresden-Meissen
 Diocese of Görlitz

Ecclesiastical province of Cologne 
Alternative name: Rhenish Ecclesiastical Province
 Archdiocese of Cologne
 Diocese of Aachen
 Diocese of Essen
 Diocese of Limburg
 Diocese of Münster
 Diocese of Trier

Ecclesiastical province of Freiburg im Breisgau 
Alternative name: Upper Rhenish Ecclesiastical Province
 Archdiocese of Freiburg im Breisgau
 Diocese of Mainz
 Diocese of Rottenburg-Stuttgart

Ecclesiastical province of Hamburg 
Alternative name: Northern German Ecclesiastical Province
 Archdiocese of Hamburg
 Diocese of Hildesheim
 Diocese of Osnabrück

Ecclesiastical province of Munich and Freising 
 Archdiocese of Munich and Freising
 Diocese of Augsburg
 Diocese of Passau
 Diocese of Regensburg

Ecclesiastical province of Paderborn 
Alternative name: Central German Ecclesiastical Province
 Archdiocese of Paderborn
 Diocese of Erfurt
 Diocese of Fulda
 Diocese of Magdeburg

Gallery of Archdioceses

References
Catholic-Hierarchy entry.
GCatholic.org.

See also
List of Roman Catholic dioceses in Germany between 1821 and 1993 

Germany
Catholic dioceses